This is a list of all cricketers who have played first-class, List A or Twenty20 cricket for the Central Districts cricket team in New Zealand. Seasons given are first and last seasons; the player did not necessarily play in all the intervening seasons.

A

 Denis Aberhart, 1976/77–1982/83
 Alistair Alcock, 1992/93–1996/97
 Robert Anderson, 1977/78–1981/82
 Tim Anderson, 1998/99–2002/03
 Bryan Andrews, 1966/67–1969/70
 Doug Armstrong, 1958/59
 Dean Askew, 1991/92–1994/95
 Alec Astle, 1973/74–1978/79
 Colin Atkinson, 1975/76–1981/82
 Craig Auckram, 1989/90–1995/97
 Eric Austin, 1995/96–1996/97
 Ma'ara Ave, 2018/19

B

 Roald Badenhorst, 2011/12–2013/14
 Murray Baker, 1966/67–1971/72
 Paul Baker, 1988/89
 Bruce Baldwin, 1973/74
 Scott Baldwin, 2006/07
 Trevor Barber, 1959/60
 Colin Barclay, 1955/56
 Brady Barnett, 2011/12
 Geoff Barnett, 2004/05–2007/08
 Craig Bartlett, 1996/97
 Gary Bartlett, 1958/59–1969/70
 Don Beard, 1950/51–1960/61
 Gary Beer, 1963/64–1964/65
 Don Beuth, 1968/69
 Peter Blackbourn, 1983/84
 Ian Blackwell, 2010/11
 Tony Blain, 1982/83–1994/95
 Bob Blair, 1955/56
 David Blake, 1993/94–1998/99
 Peter Bloomfield, 1957/58–1958/59
 Peter Borren, 2011/12
 Graham Botting, 1950/51–1952/53
 Douglas Bowden, 1950/51–1957/58
 Brendon Bracewell, 1977/78–1979/80
 Doug Bracewell, 2008/09–2021/22
 Douglas Bracewell, 1976/77–1979/80
 Mark Bracewell, 1979/80
 Don Brian, 1953/54–1955/56
 Scott Briasco, 1982/83–1991/92
 Michael Brooke, 1971/72
 Murray Brown, 1973/74–1974/75
 Ron Brown, 1952/53–1957/58
 Rodney Brown, 1988/89–1998/99
 Tom Bruce, 2014/15–2021/22
 Graham Buist, 1956/57–1957/58
 Carl Bulfin, 1996/97–1997/98
 Wayne Burtt, 1973/74–1974/75

C

 Carl Cachopa, 2010/11–2013/14
 Lance Cairns, 1972/73–1975/76
 David Calkin, 1969/70
 Marc Calkin, 2008/09
 Harry Cave, 1950/51–1958/59
 Duncan Cederman, 2004/05
 Rex Challies, 1951/52–1954/55
 Murray Chapple, 1950/51–1965/66
 Ian Ching, 1950/51–1955/56
 Josh Clarkson, 2015/16–2021/22
 Mitchell Claydon, 2015/16
 Dane Cleaver, 2010/11–2021/22
 Don Cleverley, 1952/53
 Josh Cobb, 2013/14
 Richard Collinge, 1963/64–1969/70
 Ian Colquhoun, 1953/54–1963/64
 Bevan Congdon, 1960/61–1970/71
 David Cooper, 1993/94–1996/97
 Peter Coutts, 1958/59–1972/73
 Richard Cox, 1975/76
 Carl Crafar, 1986/87
 Emmett Craik, 1999/00
 Arthur Cresswell, 1950/51–1951/52
 Fen Cresswell, 1950/51–1954/55
 Martin Crowe, 1983/84–1989/90
 Chris Cruikshank, 2006/07
 Don Currie, 1959/60–1962/63

D

 James de Terte, 2007/08–2011/12
 Brendon Diamanti, 2000/01–2010/11
 Barry Dineen, 1962/63–1963/64
 Graham Douglas, 1965/66–1967/68
 Mark Douglas, 1987/88–2000/01
 Les Downes, 1975/76
 Terence Dravitzki, 1962/63
 Liam Dudding, 2015/16–2021/22
 Stu Duff, 1985/86–1995/96
 Graham Duncan, 1970/71–1971/72
 Percy Dyhrberg, 1951/52

E
 Jock Edwards, 1973/74–1984/85
 Richard Ellis, 1971/72–1977/78
 Jarrod Englefield, 1998/99–2005/06

F

 Luke Feldman, 2016/17
 Craig Findlay, 1995/96–1999/00
 Dean Finlay, 1988/89
 Eric Fisher, 1954/55
 Ian Fisher, 1989/90–1990/91
 Dean Foxcroft, 2018/19
 Dave Fulton, 1993/94
 Blair Furlong, 1963/64–1973/74
 Campbell Furlong, 1994/95–2006/07
 John Furlong, 1990/91–1993/94

G

 Craig Garner, 1992/93–1996/97
 Charles Garrod, 1966/67
 Caleb Gaylard, 2013/14
 Roy Gearry, 1969/70–1970/71
 Paul Gibbs, 1990/91–1991/92
 Michael Gill, 1974/75–1981/82
 Stephen Gill, 1981/82–1987/88
 Ross Glover, 1985/86–1991/92
 Matthew Goodson, 1989/90
 Mark Greatbatch, 1986/87–1999/00
 Wayne Greenstreet, 1973/74
 Bevan Griggs, 2000/01–2010/11
 David Guthardt, 1985/86–1988/89
 John Guy, 1952/53–1962/63

H

 Gerald Haddon, 1969/70
 Bruce Hamilton, 1953/54–1954/55
 Lance Hamilton, 1996/97–2006/07
 Barry Hampton, 1961/62–1968/69
 Ian Hampton, 1962/63–1965/66
 Richard Harden, 1987/88–1990/91
 Noel Harford, 1953/54–1958/59
 Greg Hart, 1994/95
 Ron Hart, 1982/83–1990/91
 David Hartshorn, 1993/94
 Brian Hastings, 1960/61
 Greg Hay, 2006/07–2021/22
 Richard Hayward, 1982/83–1985/86
 Brent Hefford, 1999/00–2008/09
 Greg Hegglun, 2004/05–2007/08
 John Henderson, 1960/61
 Tony Hill, 1975/76–1976/77
 Joseph Hill, 1999/00–2000/01
 Wayne Hodgson, 1979/80–1981/82
 Peter Holland, 1976/77–1977/78
 Stefan Hook-Sporry, 2019/20
 Terry Horne, 1977/78–1979/80
 Julian Houghton, 1953/54
 Jamie How, 2000/01–2014/15
 John Howell, 1966/67–1972/73
 Llorne Howell, 1994/95–1996/97
 Allan Hunter, 1951/52–1955/56
 Ray Hutchison, 1975/76

I
 Craig Ingham, 1990/91–1995/96
 Peter Ingram, 1998/99–2011/12

J

 Murray Jamieson, 1980/81–1982/83
 Kyle Jarvis, 2011/12–2012/13
 Mahela Jayawardene, 2015/16–2016/17
 Andrew Jones, 1979/80–1995/96
 Barrie Jones, 1952/53–1954/55
 Jim Jones, 1954/55–1956/57
 Alistar Jordan, 1968/69–1979/80

K

 Marty Kain, 2011/12–2016/17
 Dennis Kay, 1974/75–1977/78
 David Kelly, 1998/99–2001/02
 Robert Kelly, 1961/62
 Richard King, 2001/02
 David Kinsella, 1961/62–1965/66
 David Kivell, 1952/53–1955/56
 Jeremy Kuru, 2009/10–2010/11

L

 David Lamason, 1990/91–1996/97
 Andrew Lamb, 2012/13
 Mark Lane, 1993/94
 Gary Langridge, 1976/77–1981/82
 Ian Leggat, 1950/51–1961/62
 Jayden Lennox, 2019/20-2021/22
 David Leonard, 1989/90–1993/94
 Christian Leopard, 2015/16–2019/20
 Warren Linn, 1981/82
 Gregory Logan, 1986/87–1989/90
 Greg Loveridge, 1994/95–2002/03
 Graeme Lowans, 1959/60–1964/65
 Paul Lowes, 1990/91
 Willem Ludick, 2017/18–2019/20
 Tim Lythe, 2007/08

M

 Mitchell McClenaghan, 2007/08–2010/11
 Ryan McCone, 2016/17–2018/19
 Peter McGlashan, 1998/99–2001/02
 Peter McGregor, 1969/70
 Alexander McGuire, 1957/58
 Evon McInnis, 2007/08
 Jarrod McKay, 2019/20
 Terry McKenna, 1987/88–1989/90
 Donald MacLeod, 1956/57–1966/67
 Richard McLeod, 1990/91
 Gavin McRae, 1992/93–1995/96
 Ervin McSweeney, 1979/80–1980/81
 Colin McVicar, 1950/51–1951/52
 Kervin Marc, 1999/00
 Kenneth Martin, 1984/85–1987/88
 Michael Mason, 1997/98–2011/12
 Andrew Mathieson, 2012/13–2016/17
 Paul Maunder, 1961/62
 David Meiring, 2013/14–2015/16
 Ted Meuli, 1950/51–1959/60
 Lawrie Miller, 1950/51–1952/53
 Adam Milne, 2009/10–2021/22
 Glenn Milnes, 1997/98–1999/00
 Amit Mishra, 2008/09
 Haydn Morgan, 2000/01
 Douglas Morland, 1973/74
 John Morrison, 1965/66–1966/67
 Ernest Mummery, 1961/62
 Warren Murdock, 1962/63–1974/75
 Tony Murphy, 1985/86
 Felix Murray, 2017/18–2018/19
 Luke Murray, 2007/08

N

 Graham Napier, 2009/10–2011/12
 David Neal, 1971/72–1976/77
 John Nelson, 2001/02
 Tarun Nethula, 2010/11–2013/14
 Philip Newman, 1958/59
 Andrew Niblett, 2006/07
 Kieran Noema-Barnett, 2008/09–2020/21

O

 Karl O'Dowda, 1988/89
 John Ogilvie, 1994/95–1995/96
 Joe Ongley, 1950/51–1951/52
 Jacob Oram, 1997/98–2013/14
 Ross Ormiston, 1975/76–1977/78
 David O'Sullivan, 1972/73–1984/85

P

 Desmond Park, 1957/58
 Ajaz Patel, 2012/13–2021/22
 Min Patel, 2005/06
 Navin Patel, 2015/16–2018/19
 Andrew Paterson, 1973/74
 Brad Patton, 2003/04–2010/11
 Jason Pawley, 1994/95–1995/96
 Michael Pawson, 1990/91–1995/96
 Dermot Payton, 1965/66–1976/77
 Andrew Penn, 1994/95–1999/00
 Roger Pierce, 1971/72–1984/85
 Vic Pollard, 1964/65–1968/69

R

 Seth Rance, 2008/09–2021/22
 Jeet Raval, 2012/13
 Dominic Rayner, 2006/07
 Lawrence Reade, 1958/59–1962/63
 Tom Reaney, 1950/51
 Mitch Renwick, 2015/16–2017/18
 Herbert Rice, 1950/51
 Kurt Richards, 2007/08–2015/16
 Dave Richardson, 1984/85
 Gary Robertson, 1979/80–1989/90
 Stephen Robertson, 1985/86–1990/91
 Taraia Robin, 1999/00–2000/01
 Dean Robinson, 2011/12–2015/16
 Gerald Rose, 1958/59
 Gordon Rowe, 1952/53
 Ian Rutherford, 1977/78
 Maurice Ryan, 1967/68–1969/70
 Jesse Ryder, 2002/03–2017/18

S

 Henry Sampson, 1970/71–1972/73
 Ian Sandbrook, 2002/03
 Robbie Schaw, 2006/07–2008/09
 Brad Schmulian, 2017/18–2021/22
 Robin Schofield, 1959/60–1974/75
 Andrew Schwass, 1998/99–2004/05
 Richard Scragg, 2001/02
 Tim Selwood, 1972/73
 Indika Senaratne, 2015/16
 Richard Sherlock, 2003/04–2008/09
 Anthony Short, 1978/79–1979/80
 Mike Shrimpton, 1961/62–1979/80
 Martyn Sigley, 1994/95–2002/03
 Sanjeewa Silva, 2000/01
 Rex Simpson, 1955/56–1957/58
 Mathew Sinclair, 1995/96–2012/13
 Anthony Small, 1955/56
 Bevan Small, 2010/11–2018/19
 Richard Small, 1958/59–1962/63
 Glen Smidt, 1986/87
 Steven Smidt, 2011/12–2014/15
 Ben Smith, 2000/01–2001/02
 Ben Smith, 2010/11–2021/22
 Campbell Smith, 1983/84–1990/91
 Ian Smith, 1977/78–1986/87
 Keith Smith, 1955/56–1960/61
 Ian Snook, 1972/73–1987/88
 Lindsay Sparks, 1967/68–1970/71
 Craig Spearman, 1996/97–2004/05
 David Spence, 1954/55–1961/62
 Bruce Stewart, 1972/73
 Raymond Stewart, 1974/75
 Derek Stirling, 1981/82–1987/88
 Ben Stoyanoff, 2019/20
 Glen Sulzberger, 1995/96–2004/05

T

 Michael Taiaroa, 2007/08
 David Tarrant, 1954/55–1957/58
 Ross Taylor, 2002/03–2021/22
 Mattie Thomas, 2014/15–2015/16
 Roderick Thomas, 1975/76–1977/78
 Ewen Thompson, 2000/01–2009/10
 Blair Tickner, 2014/15–2021/22
 Greg Todd, 2000/01–2011/12
 Raymond Toole, 2019/20–2021/22
 Matthew Toynbee, 1977/78–1984/85
 Carl Trask, 1999/00
 Peter Trego, 2012/13–2013/14
 Maurice Tremlett, 1951/52
 Bruce Turner, 1951/52–1955/56
 Roger Twose, 1991/92–1993/94

U
 Paul Unwin, 1986/87–1992/93

V

 Kruger van Wyk, 2010/11–2015/16
 Peter Verhoek, 1978/79–1980/81
 John Vernon, 1961/62
 Murali Vijay, 2008/09
 Peter Visser, 1983/84–1986/87

W

 Ken Wadsworth, 1968/69–1971/72
 Matthew Walker, 1995/96–1998/99
 Gary Walton, 1985/86–1987/88
 Ryan Watson, 2019/20
 Christopher Webb, 1981/82
 Gareth West, 2000/01–2001/02
 Regan West, 1996/97–2004/05
 Tim Weston, 2005/06–2010/11
 Ben Wheeler, 2009/10–2019/20
 Ian Wheeler, 1974/75
 Paul Whitaker, 1995/96
 Craig White, 1999/00
 Kevin White, 1979/80
 Bayley Wiggins, 2018/19–2021/22
 Richard Wilde, 1951/52
 Brent Williams, 1996/97
 Michael Wilson, 1959/60
 Simon Wilson, 1990/91–1993/94
 John Wiltshire, 1981/82–1983/84
 Warren Wisneski, 1992/93–1995/96
 Richard Wixon, 1991/92–1992/93
 George Worker, 2007/08–2020/21
 Robert Wylie, 1973/74

Y
 Michael Yardy, 2010/11
 Will Young, 2011/12–2021/22
 Bryan Yuile, 1959/60–1971/72

Notes

References

Central Districts